Marlborough House is a mansion at 54, Old Steine, Brighton on the south coast of England. It is a Grade I listed building. Initially it was built for Samuel Shergold in the 1760s. After being sold on by both Shergold and its second owner, the Duke of Marlborough, in 1786 it was bought by William Gerard Hamilton and altered to a  neoclassical design by Robert Adam. After being owned by the Brighton School Board and Brighton and Hove City Council, it was sold to a local businessman in 1999. Since then, the building has stood empty and original features have been destroyed, leading to several courtcases.

History
A building was constructed on the site in the 1760s by local inn owner Sam Shergold. In the 1800s, Marlborough House was known as Grove House and the Prince of Wales, later King George IV stayed there in 1783, 1789 and 1795, whilst the Royal Pavilion was being renovated by John Nash. In 1786, the building was bought by statesman William Gerard Hamilton from the third Duke of Marlborough. It was Hamilton who employed Robert Adam to change the features in the neoclassical style. Following Hamilton's death The building was leased in 1870 to the Brighton School Board, which then bought it in 1893.

In the 1990s, Brighton and Hove City Council used Marlborough House as a tourist information centre before selling it to local businessman Tony Antoniades for £500,000 in 1999. Since then, the building has stood empty, occasionally being squatted.

Deterioration
Antoniades at first intended to live at Marlborough House but he never moved in. Initial optimism about the planned renovations faded. By 2015, the building was badly water damaged and the original fireplaces had been removed to a warehouse in London, where they perished in a fire. The building was placed on the English Heritage "at risk" list. A representative of Historic England said "Our hands are tied to some extent if a private owner cannot or will not maintain the building – we are an advisory body."

By 2017, the Regency Society noted that 18th century roof lights had been taken out and mahogany doors had been destroyed. Further, an oil-based render pioneered by John Liardet had been painted over on the front of the building without an application for Listed Building Consent. Brighton and Hove City Council issued an enforcement notice for the paint to be removed, only to be overruled by the Planning Inspectorate in 2018.

By 2019, the Council confirmed it was dropping its legal actions against Antoniades because a new planning application had been made which would correct the illegal changes to the building. Antoniades announced his new plan to turn the building into a wine bar. He had previously stated regarding Marlborough House that "it needs an expert. And that’s not me."

References

Further reading

English Heritage report

Houses in Brighton and Hove
Grade I listed buildings in Brighton and Hove
Grade I listed houses
Houses completed in 1765
Robert Adam buildings
1765 establishments in England